Verkhnemancharovo (Ürge Manşır) is a rural locality (a selo) in Igmetovsky Selsoviet, Ilishevsky District, Bashkortostan, Russia. In 2010, The population was 524. There are 7 streets.

Geography 
Verkhnemancharovo is located 23 km southeast of Verkhneyarkeyevo (the district's administrative centre) by road. Igmetovo is the nearest rural locality.

References 

Rural localities in Ilishevsky District